Danezaa may refer to:
Danezaa people, an ethnic group of the Athabaskan people 
Danezaa language, spoken by the Danezaa